Bishop is a town in Oconee County, Georgia, United States. As of the 2020 census, the city had a population of 332.

The town's historic district was added to the National Register of Historic Places in 1996.

History
The community was named after W. H. Bishop, a local landowner and politician. A post office called Bishop has been in operation since 1889. The town was incorporated in 1890.

Geography
Bishop is located at  (33.816355, -83.436304).

Demographics

2020 census

As of the 2020 United States census, there were 332 people, 115 households, and 102 families residing in the town.

2000 census
As of the census of 2000, there were 146 people, 57 households, and 38 families residing in the town. The racial makeup of the town was 100.00% White.

There were 57 households, out of which 29.8% had children under the age of 18 living with them, 57.9% were married couples living together, 7.0% had a female householder with no husband present, and 31.6% were non-families. 26.3% of all households were made up of individuals, and 12.3% had someone living alone who was 65 years of age or older. The average household size was 2.56 and the average family size was 2.97.

In the town, the population was spread out, with 24.7% under the age of 18, 9.6% from 18 to 24, 27.4% from 25 to 44, 20.5% from 45 to 64, and 17.8% who were 65 years of age or older. The median age was 36 years. For every 100 females, there were 87.2 males. For every 100 females age 18 and over, there were 89.7 males.

The median income for a household in the town was $43,125, and the median income for a family was $51,250. Males had a median income of $31,250 versus $16,875 for females. The per capita income for the town was $15,630. There were 2.8% of families and 4.8% of the population living below the poverty line, including no under eighteens and 15.8% of those over 64.

References

Towns in Georgia (U.S. state)
Towns in Oconee County, Georgia
Athens – Clarke County metropolitan area